Brückl is a town in the district of Sankt Veit an der Glan in the Austrian state of Carinthia.

Geography
Brückl lies at the confluence of the Görtschitz and the Gurk between Magdalensberg and Saualpe.

References

Cities and towns in Sankt Veit an der Glan District